Cossé-d'Anjou (literally Cossé of Anjou) is a former commune in the Maine-et-Loire department in western France.

On 15 December 2015, Chanzeaux, La Chapelle-Rousselin, Chemillé-Melay, Cossé-d’Anjou, La Jumellière, Neuvy-en-Mauges, Sainte-Christine, Saint-Georges-des-Gardes, Saint-Lézin, La Salle-de-Vihiers, La Tourlandry and Valanjou merged becoming one commune called Chemillé-en-Anjou.

See also
Communes of the Maine-et-Loire department

References

Cossedanjou